50th Wing may refer to:

50th Space Wing
50th Troop Carrier Wing, active from 1941 to 1946